Sira is a city and taluk headquarters of Sira Taluk of Tumakuru district in the state of Karnataka, India. It lies on the AH 47, NH 48 (earlier NH 4).

Geography
It has an average elevation of 662 metres (2171 feet).

Demographics

 India census, Sira had a population of 57,554. Males constitute 52% of the population and females 48%.  Literacy rate of Sira city is 83.77% higher than state average of 75.36%. In Sira, Male literacy is around 87.47% while female literacy rate is 79.99%.  In Sira, 11.68% of the population is under 6 years of age.

Sites of Importance
Kasturi Rangappa Nayaka Fort
Mallik Rehan Tomb, Sira
Purlehalli Bhuthappa Temple 
Maradi gudda Sree Ranganatha swamy Temple
Sri Kambadha Ranganatha swamy temple, Magodu

Notable people
Baraguru Ramachandrappa - writer, scholar, filmmaker
Chandra Arya Member of Parliament canada
S K Dasappa politician, founder of Kanaka Bank-Sira,Ex-MLA of Sira

See also 
 Sira Taluk
 Province of Sira
 Tumkur
 Tumkur District
 Taluks of Karnataka
 Hagalavadi
 Ajjenahalli, Sira

References

External links 

 Sira city
  Benjamin Rice, Lewis,  Mysore: A Gazetteer Compiled for the Government, Volume I, Mysore In General, 1897a, Westminster: Archibald Constable and Company. Pp. xix, 834
  Archaeological Survey of India, Bangalore circle, List showing protected monuments (For Sira, see Sl. No: 198 & 199)
  Plea to protect fort in Sira  (Story in Deccan Herald, Bangalore, 19 May 2008)

Cities and towns in Tumkur district
Forts in Karnataka
Buildings and structures in Tumkur district